August Karl Krönig (20 September 1822 – 5 June 1879) was a German chemist and physicist who published an account of the kinetic theory of gases in 1856, probably after reading a paper by John James Waterston.

Biography
Krönig was born in Schildesche, now part of Bielefeld. After completing his Abitur he attended the University of Bonn for three semesters beginning in 1839 studying primarily Oriental languages. In 1840 he changed focus to physics, chemistry and mathematics and transferred to the University of Berlin, where he completed his doctorate in 1845 with a thesis on chromate salts. He then taught at two schools in Berlin, the Realgymnasium in Cölln and the Königliche Realschule attached to the Friedrich-Wilhelms-Gymnasium in Berlin. In 1864 he was given a professorship, but he was forced to retire the same year for reasons of ill health.

In 1851 Krönig self-published the Journal für Physik und physikalische Chemie des Auslandes in vollständigen Übersichten, but only one year of issues appeared. In 1856 he published a paper on the kinetic theory of gases, thereby becoming a pioneer of statistical mechanics and thermodynamics alongside Rudolf Clausius, James Clerk Maxwell and Ludwig Boltzmann. The paper echoes John James Waterston's 1851 paper on the topic, and may be based on it; Clausius' work was sparked by Krönig's paper but emphasised the implication of "equal volumes equal numbers", which Waterston and Krönig merely noted. Krönig also published various writings on science and on philosophy and theology.

He died in Berlin; his remains were reburied in the family grave at the Südwestkirchhof Stahnsdorf, in Stahnsdorf, near Berlin.

Publications
 De acidi chromici salibus cristallinis (doctoral thesis), Berlin, 1845 
 Neue Methode zur Vermeidung und Auffindung von Rechenfehlern vermittelst der Neuner-, Elfer-, Siebenunddreißiger- und Hundertundeinerprobe. Ein Hülfsmittel für Zahlenrechner, Berlin, 1855
 "Grundzüge einer Theorie der Gase", Annalen der Physik [2]33 (1856), 315
 Die Chemie, bearbeitet als Bildungsmittel für den Verstand zum Gebrauche bei dem chemischen Unterricht an höheren Lehranstalten, Berlin 1864
 Wie kritisirt man chemische Lehrbücher? Eine Antikritik, Berlin, 1865
 Die Werthlosigkeit einer grossen Anzahl von chemischen Formeln: Dargethan durch die Grösse der Fehler in Liebig's Analysen und neues Verfahren zur Ableitung der Formel einer Verbindung aus den Gewichtsmengen der Bestandtheile, Berlin: Julius Springer, 1866
 Das Dasein Gottes und das Glück der Menschen, materialistisch-erfahrungsphilosophische Studien, insbesondere über die Gottesfrage und den Darwinismus, über den Selbstbeglückungstrieb als Fundament der Lebensweisheit und praktischen Moral und über die Hauptlehren Kant's und Schopenhauer's, Berlin, 1874
 Sechs neue Rezepte betr. billige Ernährung, Berlin, 1874

See also
Ideal gas law

References

Sources
 "August Krönig". In: J. C. Poggendorff. Biographisch-literarisches Handwörterbuch der exacten Wissenschaften, Leipzig, 1863, Volume 1, p. 752; 1898, Volume 3, p. 752 
 Stefan Wolff. "August Krönig". In: Dieter Hoffmann, Hubert Leitko and Staffan Müller-Wille, eds. Lexikon bedeutender Naturwissenschaftler. Wiesbaden-Heidelberg, 2004, Volume 2, p. 345 
 Fritz Krafft. Die wichtigsten Naturwissenschaftler im Porträt. Wiesbaden, 2007, p. 210
 Michael Gamper. Masse lesen, Masse schreiben. Eine Diskurs- und Imaginationsgeschichte. Munich, 2007, pp. 437–38

1822 births
1879 deaths
19th-century German chemists
19th-century German physicists
Scientists from Bielefeld